The Kentucky Derby Challenge Stakes was an English Thoroughbred horse race intended to become an annual race, but was run only once on 18 March 2009 at Kempton Park Racecourse in Sunbury-on-Thames, Surrey. Open to three-year-old horses, it was raced clockwise at a distance of nine furlongs ( miles, app. 1800 metres) on Polytrack.

The winner of the race was guaranteed one of the twenty starting spots in the  mile (10 furlongs) 2009 Kentucky Derby held on the first Saturday in May on the dirt track at Churchill Downs in Louisville, Kentucky. The race offered a purse of US$150,000 of which $90,000 came from Churchill Downs and $60,000 from Kempton. In addition, if the race winner exercised their right to run in the Kentucky Derby, they would receive a further $100,000 bonus payment plus would be given an automatic spot in the ensuing two legs of the U.S. Triple Crown series, the Preakness and Belmont Stakes.

No European-based horse has ever won the Kentucky Derby.

The 2010 race was suspended and the 2009 winner, Mafaaz did not run in the Kentucky Derby, although he did run in the Blue Grass Stakes.

Winners

References

Racing Post:

 September 19 2008 The Guardian newspaper article titled Challenge Stakes winner to start the Kentucky Derby
 The 2009 Kentucky Derby Challenge Stakes at ESPN

Flat races in Great Britain
Kempton Park Racecourse
Flat horse races for three-year-olds
Kentucky Derby
Discontinued horse races
March 2009 sports events in the United Kingdom
Recurring sporting events established in 2009
Recurring sporting events disestablished in 2009
2009 establishments in England
2009 disestablishments in England